The canton of Saint-Léonard-de-Noblat is a French canton located in the department of Haute-Vienne and in the region of Nouvelle-Aquitaine.

Geography
This canton is organized around Saint-Léonard-de-Noblat in the Arrondissement of Limoges. Its altitude is between 235 meters in (Royères) and 586 meters in (Sauviat-sur-Vige) with an average of 373 m.

Administration
In 2015, Christelle Aupetit-Berthelemot and Jean-Claude Leblois won the election.

Composition

Since the French canton reorganisation which came into effect in March 2015, the communes of the canton of Saint-Léonard-de-Noblat are:

 Aureil
 Champnétery
 Le Châtenet-en-Dognon
 Eybouleuf
 La Geneytouse
 Moissannes
 Royères
 Saint-Denis-des-Murs
 Saint-Just-le-Martel
 Saint-Léonard-de-Noblat
 Saint-Martin-Terressus
 Saint-Priest-Taurion
 Sauviat-sur-Vige

Demographics

See also
 Cantons of the Haute-Vienne department
 Arrondissement of Limoges

References

Saint-Leonard-de-Noblat